Laquet de Gréziolles is a lake in Hautes-Pyrénées, Pyrénées, France. At an elevation of 2119 m, its surface area is 0.017 km².

In the neighbourhood of the larger lac de Gréziollles, it is accessible by the GR 10 C footpath.

Lakes of Hautes-Pyrénées